August Halm (1869–1929) was a German music educationist and composer.

References

Further reading 

 

1869 births
1929 deaths
German music educators
19th-century German composers
20th-century German composers